Gabrielle Marie DeLoof (born March 13, 1996) is an American swimmer.

She participated at the 2019 World Aquatics Championships, winning a silver medal for her participation in the team that came second in the heats.

She is the sister of 2020 Olympian Catie Deloof.

For the 2021 International Swimming League, the team Tokyo Frog Kings signed DeLoof to their roster.

References

External links
 

1996 births
Living people
American female freestyle swimmers
World Aquatics Championships medalists in swimming
Universiade medalists in swimming
Universiade gold medalists for the United States
Michigan Wolverines women's swimmers
People from Grosse Pointe, Michigan
Medalists at the 2019 Summer Universiade
21st-century American women